Kucka is a Slavic surname. Notable people with the surname include:

 Juraj Kucka (born 1987), Slovak football player 
 Kathleen Kucka, American painter

Slavic-language surnames